Veronique Mifsud (born 11 February 2003) is a Maltese footballer who plays as a midfielder for Birkirkara and the Malta women's national team.

Career
She made her debut for the Malta national team on 7 April 2019 against Romania, coming on as a substitute for Nicole Sciberras.

References

2003 births
Living people
Women's association football midfielders
Maltese women's footballers
Malta women's international footballers
Birkirkara F.C. (women) players